Mike Harris (born 6 May 1969) is a British rower. He competed in the men's quadruple sculls event at the 1992 Summer Olympics.

References

External links
 

1969 births
Living people
British male rowers
Olympic rowers of Great Britain
Rowers at the 1992 Summer Olympics
Sportspeople from Barry, Vale of Glamorgan